Wilhelmina Bay is a bay  wide between the Reclus Peninsula and Cape Anna along the west coast of Graham Land on the Antarctic Peninsula. It was discovered by the Belgian Antarctic Expedition of 1897-99 led by Adrien de Gerlache. The bay is named for Wilhelmina, Queen of the Netherlands, who reigned from 1890 to 1948.

Wilhelmina Bay is dubbed "Whale-mina Bay" for its large number of humpback whales. It is a popular destination for tourist expedition ships to Antarctica thanks to its abundant whale population and spectacular scenery. The bay is surrounded by steep cliffs full of snow and glaciers. An almost perfect pyramid-shaped peak towers over the water.

See also
Gerlache Strait Geology
Plata Passage

References

Bays of Graham Land
Danco Coast